Astrolepis is a small genus of ferns in the family Pteridaceae. It was formed in 1992 from species previously placed in Cheilanthes and Notholaena. The name is derived from the Greek words ἄστρον, meaning "star," and λεπίς, meaning "scale," referring to the star-like scales on adaxial blade surfaces. Members of the genus are commonly known as star-scaled cloak ferns and are native to the Americas.

Species
, the Checklist of Ferns and Lycophytes of the World recognized the following species:
Astrolepis cochisensis (Goodd.) D.M.Benham & Windham – Cochise scaly cloakfern
Astrolepis crassifolia (Houlston & T.Moore) D.M.Benham & Windham
Astrolepis deltoidea (Baker) J.B.Beck & Windham
Astrolepis integerrima (Hook.) D.M.Benham & Windham – hybrid cloakfern
Astrolepis laevis (M.Martens & Galeotti) Mickel
Astrolepis obscura J.B.Beck & Windham
Astrolepis sinuata (Lag. ex Sw.) D.M.Benham & Windham – wavy scaly cloakfern
Astrolepis windhamii D.M.Benham – Windham's scaly cloakfern

References

External links

Jepson Manual Treatment
USDA Plants Profile

Pteridaceae
Fern genera